Atopochilus is a genus of upside-down catfishes native to Africa.

Species 
There are currently seven recognized species in this genus:
 Atopochilus chabanaudi Pellegrin, 1938
 Atopochilus christyi Boulenger, 1920
 Atopochilus macrocephalus Boulenger, 1906
 Atopochilus mandevillei Poll, 1959
 Atopochilus pachychilus Pellegrin, 1924
 Atopochilus savorgnani Sauvage, 1879
 Atopochilus vogti Pellegrin, 1922

Description 
Atopochilus species have their lips and barbels modified into a suckermouth.

References

 
Mochokidae
Fish of Africa
Catfish genera
Taxa named by Henri Émile Sauvage
Freshwater fish genera